Capel Bangor is a small village in Ceredigion, Wales, approximately  east of Aberystwyth.

The A44 road and the seasonal Vale of Rheidol Railway pass through.

In the 2011 census, the population was 256, with 63% born in Wales.

Church 
The Church in Wales St. David's Church was built to the classical designs of George Clinton of Aberystwyth between 1837 and 1839.

Railway station 

Capel Bangor railway station is on the seasonal Vale of Rheidol Railway. Unlike most other preserved railways in the United Kingdom, the Vale of Rheidol Railway did not have a period of closure between its being part of the national rail system and becoming a heritage railway, and so has operated a continuous service for residents and tourists.

Tourism and local economy 
 The Magic of Life Butterfly House, an all-weather butterfly zoo visitor attraction.

References

Villages in Ceredigion